The University of Belgrano (commonly referred to as UB) is a private university established in 1964 and located in the Belgrano district of the city of Buenos Aires, Argentina.

Overview 
The university has nine departments:

 Architecture and Urban Planning
 Law and Political Science
 Economics
 Humanities
 Engineering and Computer Technology
 Agricultural Sciences
 Language and Foreign Studies
 Health Sciences
 Applied Sciences

The school operates 90.9 FM, a station featuring eclectic programming and daily BBC News broadcasts.

The school offers an international program called The Argentine and Latin American Studies Program (PEAL) which is a five-week term  consisting of two courses in Spanish at intermediate and advanced level, and four upper division survey courses in Latin American Studies at the 300 level.

Ranking
According to the QS World University Rankings, UB is the seventh best private university in the country and is ranked fifth in Buenos Aires.

Notable people
 Alicia Beatriz Casullo (1940–2019), psychoanalyst

References

External links

 Official website

 
Educational institutions established in 1964
Education in Buenos Aires
1964 establishments in Argentina